Körös is a river in Hungary and Romania.

Körös can also refer to:

 SMS Körös, the name ship of the Körös-class river monitors built for the Austro-Hungarian Navy
 Matúš Körös (born 2003), Slovak football player

See also
 Körös culture, a Neolithic archaeological culture in Central Europe that was named after the river Körös
 Koros (disambiguation)
 Kőrös (disambiguation)